Koumbala is a town in northern Ivory Coast. It is a sub-prefecture and commune of Ferkessédougou Department in Tchologo Region, Savanes District.

In 2014, the population of the sub-prefecture of Koumbala was 10,088.

Villages
The 15 villages of the sub-prefecture of Koumbala and their population in 2014 are:

Notes

Sub-prefectures of Tchologo
Communes of Tchologo